Lab Kita, Bilib Ka Ba? is a 1994 Philippine romantic action film directed by Gene Palomo. The film stars Robin Padilla and Ruffa Gutierrez.

Cast
 Robin Padilla as Carlos / Billy
 Ruffa Gutierrez as Gemma
 Charito Solis as Chayong
 Jess Lapid Jr. as Marco
 Jaclyn Jose as Olga
 Derick Hiballer as Romy
 Dan Alvaro as Alvaro
 Gabriel Romulo as Romulo
 Ramon Christopher as Boogie
 Amado Cortez as Mario
 Mely Tagasa as Yaya
 Augusto Victa as Ancho
 King Gutierrez as Marco's Henchman
 June Hidalgo as Marco's Henchman
 July Hidalgo as Marco's Henchman

Production
Production took place while Robin Padilla was on bail. His involvement in the film caught the attention of Viva Films, which sued him for breach of contract in which he is an exclusive artist. He left two films with Viva, including Oo Na, Sige Na, unfinished.

Release
The film was slated to be released in July. However, it didn't push through due to Ruffa Gutierrez's involvement in the 1994 Manila Film Festival scam, resulting to her being temporarily banned from the theaters, and a string of lawsuits Robin Padilla faced at that time, including his conviction for illegal possession of firearms and his breach of contract with Viva. After things were sorted out, the film was finally released in October.

References

External links

1994 films
1994 action films
1990s romantic action films
Filipino-language films
Philippine action films